Miejski Klub Sportowy Sokół Nisko, commonly referred to as Sokół Nisko, is a Polish football club based in Nisko, Podkarpackie Voivodeship. Sokół currently compete in the IV liga Subcarpathia. The club's name literally means falcon in Polish, and it comes from the Polish Gymnastic Society "Sokół".

History
The club was founded in 1919, primarily participating in the Lwów's sub-district B-class. After World War II, from 1944 the club operated under the name OMTUR Nisko, and later, in the early period of the Polish People's Republic, it operated under other names under the nomenclature of sports associations: Zenit Nisko, Związkowiec Nisko and Ogniwo Nisko. The greatest success of this team were appearances in III liga, then the third tier. From the 2008–09 season, the team regularly plays between the 5th and 6th football's level.

In the 2007–2008 and 2008–2009 seasons, the club won the Polish Cup at the level of the Stalowa Wola sub-district, defeating Tloki Gorzyce after penalties and Siarka Tarnobrzeg in extra time with a score of 5–4.

Honours
 Subcarpathian/Rzeszów Polish Cup:
 Winners (4): 1965, 1966, 1967, 1988
 Finalist (1): 2008–09
 Subcarpathian Stalowa Wola Polish Cup:
 Winners (3): 2007–08, 2008–09, 2016–17
 VI Central Village Spartakiad in Poznań:
 Winners (1): 1966

Stadium
They play their home matches at the Stadion Miejski w Nisku (Municipal Stadium in Nisko) at the 20 Tadeusz Kościuszko Street. The capacity of the stadium is 1,600 places (950 with seats).

Players

Current squad
The Sokół's players for the 2020–21 season were: Dawid Drozd, Patryk Drzymała, Dariusz Drelich, Patryk Buda, Jacek Stępień, Patryk Tetlak, Jakub Przepłata, Jacek Maciorowski, Kamil Wojtak, Krystian Tabaka, Mateusz Szpyra, Wojciech Tyczyński, Dawid Stypa, Piotr Szewczyk, Patryk Tur, Mateusz Rutyna, Wojciech Soboń, Damian Juda, Marcin Tur, Szymon Łyko and Bartłomiej Fronc.

Former players

Notable players
  Tomasz Abramowicz, Ekstraklasa player with Stal Mielec in 1990s.
  Witold Karaś, player of the Poland national team in 1970s, Ekstraklasa player with Stal Mielec in 1960s–1980s.
  Dariusz Michalak, Ekstraklasa player with Stal Stalowa Wola in 1990s.
  Paweł Rybak, Ekstraklasa player with Stal Stalowa Wola in 1990s.

Club statistics

Supporters
Sokół Nisko fans have a friendship with supporters of the local giant Stal Stalowa Wola. They also had their fan group that suspended its activities in 2019.

Team reserve
Sokół Nisko II served as the Sokół's reserve side. The greatest success of this team was promotion to the sixth-tier liga okręgowa (regional league). In the years 2009–2013 Sokół II played in klasa B, in the season 2012–13 they won the promotion back to klasa A. After taking a place in the relegation zone after the 2013–14 season, they did not continue to play in the following years.

Notes

References

External links

 Official website
 Sokół Nisko's 90minut.pl profile
 Sokół Nisko's podkarpacielive.pl profile

 
Football clubs in Poland
Association football clubs established in 1919
1919 establishments in Poland
Football clubs in Podkarpackie Voivodeship